Jon Landau (born 23 July 1960) is an American film producer, known for producing Titanic (1997), a film which won him an Oscar and earned $2.19 billion in gross revenues, as well as Avatar (2009) and Avatar: The Way of Water (2022), which earned $2.9 billion and $2.2 billion respectively. , these are three of the four highest-grossing films of all time.

Early life
Landau is the son of Edie, a producer, and Ely A. Landau, a studio executive and producer. He attended the USC School of Cinematic Arts. His family is of Jewish background.

Career
Throughout the early '90s, Landau was Executive Vice President of Feature Film Production at Twentieth Century Fox.

He is best known for producing Titanic (1997), a film which won him an Academy Award and became the highest-grossing film of all time, the first ever to reach $1 billion in gross revenues. The film reached $1.84 billion, more than double the $914 million of then-record-holder Jurassic Park (1993). Titanic later went on to gross another $300 million in 2012, pushing the film's worldwide total to $2.18 billion, becoming the second film to ever hit $2 billion, as a result.

In 2009, Landau and James Cameron produced the science fiction blockbuster Avatar, which has since surpassed their earlier collaboration, Titanic, to become the new highest-grossing film of all time, with $2.92 billion. Avatar earned Landau his second Academy Award nomination, losing that year to The Hurt Locker.

Awards
Florida Film Critics Circle Award Winner– Titanic – (1997)
Golden Globe Award Winner– Titanic – (1998)
Producers Guild of America Darryl F Zanuck Theatrical Motion Picture Producer of the Year Award Winner – Titanic – (1998)
Academy Award Winner – Titanic – (1998)
Nickelodeon Kid's Choice Award Winner – Titanic – (1998)
MTV Movie Award Winner– Titanic – 1997
People Choice Award Winner – Titanic – (1999)
Golden Globe Award Winner – Avatar – (2010)
Producers Guild of America Darryl F Zanuck Theatrical Motion Picture Producer of the Year Award Nomination – Avatar – (2010)
Academy Award Nomination – Avatar – (2010)
Golden Globe Award Nomination – Avatar: The Way of Water – (2023)
Producers Guild of America Darryl F Zanuck Theatrical Motion Picture Producer of the Year Award Nomination – Avatar: The Way of Water – (2023)
Academy Award Nomination –  Avatar: The Way of Water – (2023)

Filmography

References

External links

1960 births
Film producers from New York (state)
Living people
Businesspeople from New York City
Producers who won the Best Picture Academy Award
Golden Globe Award-winning producers
20th-century American Jews
USC School of Cinematic Arts alumni
21st-century American Jews